Su Yeong-chin Taiwanese judge. He served as the Vice President of the Judicial Yuan from 13 October 2010 to 30 September 2016.

Early life
Su obtained his bachelor's degree in law from National Taiwan University in 1972 and his doctoral degree in law from University of Munich in Germany in 1981.

Early career
Su was an associate professor in 1981-1988 and professor in 1988–2010 at National Chengchi University (NCCU). He had also been the dean of the college of law of NCCU in 1996–1997.

See also
Judicial Yuan

References

1951 births
Living people
Ludwig Maximilian University of Munich alumni
National Taiwan University alumni
Politicians of the Republic of China on Taiwan from Miaoli County
20th-century Taiwanese lawyers
21st-century Taiwanese judges